Philip Joseph Kain (born May 21, 1943) is an American philosopher and Professor of Philosophy at Santa Clara University. He is known for his works on post-Kantian philosophy.

Books
 Schiller, Hegel, and Marx:  State, Society, and the Aesthetic Ideal of Ancient Greece.  Montreal:  McGill-Queen's University Press, 1982.
 Marx' Method, Epistemology, and Humanism:  A Study in the Development of His Thought.  Dordrecht:  D. Reidel, 1986.
 Marx and Ethics.  Oxford:  Clarendon Press, 1988.  Paperback edition 1991.
 Marx and Modern Political Theory:  From Hobbes to Contemporary Feminism.  Lanham, MD:  Rowman & Littlefield, 1993.
 Hegel and the Other:  A Study of the Phenomenology of Spirit.  Albany:  State University of New York Press, 2005.
 Nietzsche and the Horror of Existence.  Lanham, MD:  Rowman & Littlefield Lexington Books, 2009.
 Hegel and Right:  A Study of the Philosophy of Right.  Albany:  State University of New York Press, 2018.

References

21st-century American philosophers
Political philosophers
Kant scholars
Philosophy academics
Hegel scholars
Living people
1943 births